Melanie Mathys (born 3 March 1994) is a Swiss female canoeist who won medals at senior level the Wildwater Canoeing World Championships.

Biography
Mathys won three editions of the Wildwater Canoeing World Cup in K1 (2016, 2017, 2018).

Achievements

References

External links
 
 

1994 births
Living people
Swiss female canoeists
People from Solothurn
Sportspeople from the canton of Solothurn